Politburo are a British band from Manchester, England. The band was formed in 1999 by Nick Alexander (vocals), Dominic James (guitar, keyboard), Nikki Clayton (bass) and Al Macdonald (drums). 

The original line-up lasted until 2002 following which a series of line-up changes occurred over a number of years. McDonald was replaced by James McMurrugh, shortly followed by Clayton being replaced by Alex Kenyon. Kenyon and McMurrugh both left in late 2003 and Steven Joseph (bass) joined the band soon after with the band now being accompanied by a drum machine.

In 2005 the band became a four-piece again with the addition of Edd Crossman on the drums. This line-up lasted until 2009 when Crossman was replaced by Zak Hayne. Hayne left soon after and James decided to now play the drums instead of the guitar and Alexander was also playing guitar in addition to singing. Latest members Johnny Dreamguns (guitar) joined in 2011 and Phil Meredith (guitar) joined in 2012.

The band have released 3 EPs and 1 album. In their early years, the band was compared to the Dead Kennedys and Joy Division but they adopted their current more-psychedelic sound during the period 2006–2008.

Discography

Studio Albums
Sally & Prinss Revisited (2012)

EPs
The New Language (2001)
Line of Wealth (2004)
The Oldest Empire (2007)

Singles
Sally Came To See (2014)
Khali Madhya (2014)

References
www.politburo.co.uk
www.manchestermusic.co.uk
www.11stsq.com

Musical groups from Manchester
1999 establishments in England
Musical groups established in 1999
English psychedelic rock music groups